Peel Region municipal elections, 2022 were part of the larger Ontario municipal elections, that took place on Monday, October 24, 2022.

Brampton

Mayor

Patrick Brown is the incumbent, and he won re-election. He won the 2018 election with 44.43% of the vote.

On March 13, 2022, Brown announced he was running for the leadership of the Conservative Party of Canada but was disqualified by the party on July 5.

Patrick Brown, Vidya Sagar Gautam, and Nikki Kaur attended the Brampton Board of Trade debate. Kaur, Tony Moracci, and Gautam attended a debate held on October 6, by Channel Y. Brown, Gautam, Kaur, Moracci, and Bob Dosanjh Singh replied to a Brampton Guardian survey; Prabh Kaur Mand did not.

Registered candidates
 Patrick Brown (incumbent)
 Vidya Sagar Gautam, 2014 and 2018 Regional council candidate for Wards 1 & 5
 Nikki Kaur, a whistleblower within City of Brampton staff about alleged misconduct by Mayor Patrick Brown and then-CAO David Barrick, campaign to be run by political consultant and strategist Nick Kouvalis. Former Conservative candidate in Hamilton East-Stoney Creek during the 2019 Canadian federal election.
 Prabh Kaur Mand
 Tony Moracci
 Bob Singh, also known as Bob Dosanjh Singh, Punjabi media personality

Withdrawn
 Jermaine Chambers
 Ramesh Sangha, former Liberal MP for Brampton Centre
 Cody Vatcher, 2018 Regional council candidate for Wards 7 & 8

Declined
 Martin Medeiros, Regional councillor, Wards 3 & 4
 Ruby Sahota, Liberal MP for Brampton North. A representative told Global News that she was "giving thought to a potential mayoral bid," as of late July 2022; she announced on August 4 that she wouldn't run.

Results

Opinion polls

All polls during the election itself were paid for by campaigns: Mainstreet by Brown, Campaign Research by Kaur.

The October 13 poll was paid for by the Kaur campaign, and released the next day. The September 23 poll was paid for by the Brown campaign, and released October 14.

Regional council

These members are elected via double direct election, serving both on Brampton City council and Peel Regional council.

Wards 1 & 5

All candidates in this ward replied to The Brampton Guardian questionnaire sent to them. Only Idris Orughu attended the Brampton Board of Trade debate. Similarly, only Orughu attended a debate held by Channel Y, a cable broadcaster.

Registered candidates
 Idris Orughu
 Seema Passi, paralegal
 Paul Vicente (incumbent)

Results

Wards 2 & 6

The Brampton Guardian sent a survey to all registered candidates with publicly available contact information. Mansoor Ameersulthan, Azhar Hussain, Michael Palleschi, and Keba Tamara Thomas replied. Only Mansoor Ameersulthan attended the Brampton Board of Trade debate. Mansoor Ameersulthan and Azhar Hussain attended a debate held by Channel Y.

Registered candidates
 Mansoor Ameersulthan, 2018 candidate for Mayor of Brampton
 Babita Gupta
 Azhar Hussain
 Gurpreet Singh Pabla, 2014 candidate for city councillor Wards 2 & 6
 Michael Paul Palleschi (incumbent)
 KebaTamara Thomas

Results

Wards 3 & 4

The incumbent is Martin Medeiros.

Aquin George, Martin Medeiros, and Ameek Singh replied to a questionnaire from Brampton Guardian. Aquin George,  Martin Medeiros, and Ameek Singh were also the only attendees of the Brampton Board of Trade debate. All five candidates attended the Channel Y cable debate.

Registered candidates
 Andria Barrett
 Aquin George
 Martin Medeiros (incumbent)
 Ameek Singh
 Raman Vasudev

Ameek Singh Bali was registered an withdrew; it's unclear whether he is Ameek Singh. Raman Vasudev original registered to run as City Councillor, Wards 2 & 6.

Results

Wards 7 & 8

The Brampton Guardian received questionnaire responses from Michael Dancy and Gurinder Sehgal. The remainder of candidates either did not reply to the Guardian, or did not have available contact information. Pat Fortini, Cynthia Sri Pragash, and Gurinder Sehgal attended the Brampton Board of Trade debate for the ward. Channel Y cable broadcaster held debates for candidates; Pat Fortini and Gurinder Sehgal participated.

Registered candidates
 Michael Dancy
 Ripudaman Singh Dhillon
 Pat Fortini (incumbent)
 Matthew Johnson
 Gurinder Sehgal
 Cynthia Sri Pragash, affiliated with unincorporated citizens group BramptonMatters

Results

Wards 9 & 10

The incumbent for this ward is Gurpreet Singh Dhillon.

Andeep Dhade, Gurpreet Singh Dhillon, Susan Joseph, and Gurpartap Singh Toor responded to a survey sent by The Brampton Guardian. The newspaper did not receive replies or could not contact Azad Singh Goyat, Gagan Lal, or Mohammad Shoaib. Aneep Dhade, Susan Joseph, Gagan Lal, and Gurpartap Singh Toor attended the Brampton Board of Trade debate. Andeep Dhade, Azad Singh Goyat, Susan Joseph, Gagan Lal, and Gurpartap Singh Toor attended the Channel Y debate.

Registered candidates
 Andeep Dhade
 Gurpreet Singh Dhillon (incumbent)
 Azad Singh Goyat
 Susan Joseph
 Gagan Lal
 Mohammad Shoaib
 Gurpartap Singh Toor

Results

Brampton City Council

Wards 1 & 5

During the current term of council, Rowena Santos was given the city's additional Regional council position.

Rowena Santos, Stacey Ann Brooks, Steven Lee, Omprakash Kapil, and Tracy Pepe replied to a survey by The Brampton Guardian. No contact information could be found for Harshmeet Dhillon or Rafiul Islam. Channel Y hosted a debate for wards 1 & 5 candidates; of the city candidates, only Brooks and Lee attended. Brooks, Lee, and Pepe participated in a podcast discussion held by The Pointer; the others either did not reply or have contact information. Brooks, Kapil, Lee, and Pepe attended the Brampton Board of Trade debate. They received no reply from Harshmeet Dhillon, Rafiqul Islam or incumbent Rowena Santos.

Registered candidates
 Stacey Ann Brooks, realtor
 Harshmeet Dhillon
 MD Rafiqul Islam
 Omprakash Kapil
 Steven Lee
 Tracy Pepe, business owner
 Rowena Santos, incumbent

Results

Wards 2 & 6

The incumbent in the wards is Doug Whillans; he is not running for re-election.

Vijay Mair, Hardip Singh, and Navjit Kaur Brar replied to a survey from Brampton Guardian. Five other candidates — Jermaine Chambers, Sirajul Islam, Raghav Patel, Cody Vatcher, and Carmen Wilson — did not reply, and Joe Oreskevic had no available contact information. Brar, Chambers, Mair, Patel, and Vatcher attended a debate held by Channel Y, a cable broadcaster. Brampton Board of Trade broke the ward into two debates. Chambers, Mair, Patel, and Vatcher. The group had no response from Brar, Islam, Oreskevic, and Singh.

Registered candidates
 Navjit Kaur Brar, respiratory therapist, NDP MPP candidate in 2022
 Jermaine Chambers, financial advisor, Conservative MP candidate in 2021
 Sirajul Islam
 Vijay Mair
 Joe Oreskovic
 Raghav Patel, 2018 candidate for Regional councillor Wards 2 & 6, during which he did not respond to a profile request from The Brampton Guardian
 Hardip Singh
 Cody Vatcher, 2018 candidate for Regional councillor Wards 7 & 8
 Carmen Wilson

Jermaine Chambers was a registered candidate, but withdrew to run for Mayor; he returned to the original nomination in the final week. Carmen Wilson was first registered as a candidate for city council in Wards 7 & 8. Raman Vasudev registered, but later withdrew to run in Wards 3 & 4 for Regional councillor.

Results

Wards 3 & 4

The incumbent in this position is Jeff Bowman. He registered as a candidate, later withdrawing.

Brampton Guardian sent a survey to candidates. Cleopatra Gooden-Simms, Dennis Keenan, and John Sanderson replied; Carla Green, Tejeshwar Soin, and Jasmohan Singh Mankoo all either did not reply, or did not have available contact information. Cleopatra Gooden-Simms, Carla Green, John Sanderson, and Tejeshwar Soin attended a debate held by Channel Y. Green, Keenan, Sanderson, and Soin attended the Brampton Board of Trade debate. Gooden-Simms sent regrets, and Mankoo did not reply.

Registered candidates
 Cleopatra Gooden-Simms
 Carla Green
 Dennis Kennan
 Jasmohan Singh Mankoo, realtor
 John Sanderson, former Regional councillor for Wards 3 & 4 (2006-2014), 2003 Brampton Business Person of the Year, 2005 Brampton Citizen of the Year
 Tejeshwar Soin, real estate agent

Results

Wards 7 & 8

Incumbent Charmaine Williams was elected as the Member of Provincial Parliament for Brampton Centre in the 2022 provincial election, as part of the Progressive Conservative Party of Ontario.

Michael Farquharson, Cheryl Rodricks, and Rod Power replied to a questionnaire from The Brampton Guardian. Seven other candidates — Baljit Bawa, Raymond Carle, Fatima Faruq Ahmad, Damindar Ghumman, Jaskaran Sandhu, Cindy-Ann Williams, and Donna Williams — did not, while contact info for Nataleigh Ballantyne, Kuljit Singh Batra, and Gagan Sandhu was not available. Kuljit Singh Batra, Baljit Bawa, Raymond Carle, Michael Farquharson, Daminder Ghumman, and Jaskaran Sandhu attended a debate held by cable broadcaster Channel Y. Candidates Carle, Batra, and Donna Williams participated in a podcast discussion hosted by The Pointer.

Brampton Board of Trade held debate over two sessions, attended by Batra, Bawa, Carle, Farquarson, and Sandhu. Ghuman was "unable to arrive", and Ballantyne, and Fatima Faruq Ahmad did not reply in the first session. In the second section, Power, Rodricks, Sandhu, Williams, and Williams did not attend.

Registered candidates
 Fatima Faruq Ahmad
 Natalie Ballantyne
 Kuljit Singh Batra
 Baljit Bawa, People's Party of Canada candidate in Brampton Centre 2019 and Toronto Centre 2020
 Raymond Carle
 Michael Farquharson
 Damindar Ghumman, 2014 candidate for city councillor Wards 7 & 8
 Rod Power
 Cheryl Rodricks, two-time trustee candidate for the Dufferin-Peel Catholic District School Board in Mississauga, including in 2010, 2011 Mississauga by-election candidate, 2014 candidate for Regional council Brampton Wards 7 & 8, 2018 candidate for Mississauga City Council in Ward 4 by-election
 Jaskaran Sandhu
 Gagan Sandhu
 Cindy-Ann Williams, former executive assistant to Brampton city councillor Charmaine Williams, but unrelated
 Donna Williams, sister of Charmaine Williams

Cleopatra Gooden-Simms registered as a candidate, later withdrawing for City Wards 3, 4. Carmen Wilson registered as a candidate, later withdrawing for City Wards 2, 6. Rod Power registered and withdrew, before re-registering.

Results

Wards 9 & 10

The incumbent is Harkirat Singh.

A survey from Brampton Guardian received response only from Janice Gordon-Daniels. All other candidates did not reply. Cable broadcaster Channel Y hosted a debate, with Mahendra Gupta and Manpreet Singh Othi attending. Manpreet Othi was the only candidate to attend the Brampton Board of Trade debate. Baig, Gordon-Daniels and Gupta each agreed to attend, but did not. Grewal sent regrets. Incumbent Harkirat Singh did not reply.

 Arsalan Baig, 2014 councillor candidate in Etobicoke North
 Janice Gordon-Daniels
 Jagdish Singh Grewal, Canadian Punjabi Post publisher
 Mahendra Gupta, Ward 9 & 10 city council candidate in the 2018 election
 Manpreet Othi, 2019 independent federal candidate in Brampton East
 Harikrat Singh (incumbent)

Results

Caledon 

Caledon saw 34 people register for municipal office or as school trustee. Six of the nine incumbents are registered as candidates, with Jennifer Innis and Annette Groves going head-to-head for Mayor. As such, only five incumbents can be re-elected, guaranteeing at least four new councillors.

The election sees the composition of Caledon council changed, with its four Regional councillors reduce to two, and area councillors increased to six.

In the 2018 election, 32.8% of registered electors in Caledon voted.

Mayor

Regional council incumbents Jennifer Innis and Annette Groves are running for the position, made empty by the retirement of Allan Thompson.

Both candidates replied to a survey from Caledon Enterprise. Both attended a debate held by the Caledon Chamber of Commerce. Both candidates appeared on a Rogers tv candidate message program.

Registered candidates
 Annette Groves
 Jennifer Innis

Results

Regional Councillor

Ward 1, 2, 3

The combined Wards 1, 2, 3 will be the largest geographic area represented by a single Region of Peel councillor, once the 2022–2026 term of council begins. The incumbent Regional councillors for Ward 1, Ian Sinclair, and Ward 2, Johanna Downey, both decided against running in this election. In the previous term of council, Ward 3 was paired Ward 4; Wards 3/4 Regional councillor Jennifer Innis is running for Mayor.

Two Regional council incumbents in the former wards will not be standing for re-election. Ian Sinclair represented Caledon Ward 1, while Johanna Downey represented Caledon Ward 2. (Downey had registered May 4, but withdrew June 21.)

Registered candidates for the ward were Christina Early, Ramat Gill, Giacomo Giuliano, and Tom Sweeney. Of them, Early was the incumbent for area councillor ward 2, and worked previously as a senior executive for an independently owned cooperative retail pharmacy. Sweeney is a masonry business owner, and past president, Caledon Lions Club.

Christina Early, Ramat Gill, and Tom Sweeney have been interviewed by Caledon Citizen. Christina Early, Ramat Gill, and Tom Sweeney replied to a questionnaire issued by Caledon Enterprise, while Giacomo Giuliano did not. Gill was the only candidate to appear on a Rogers tv candidate message program.

Ward 4, 5, 6

The councillors for Wards 3/4 and Ward 5, Jennifer Innis and Annette Groves respectively, are both running for Mayor of Caledon. As such, there is no incumbent councillor.

Registered candidates were Anthony Caputo, Frank Di Cosola, Mario Russo, and Manjit Saini. Caputo is a real estate agent, and former president of the Caledon Chamber of Commerce, Di Cosola was the incumbent trustee for Dufferin/Caledon, Dufferin-Peel's Catholic District School Board, and Russo formerly worked for the Ontario Land Tribunal, ran for Regional council in Brampton Wards 1 & 5, 2018, and served as chair of Brampton's Committee of Adjustment for four years

Caputo, Di Cosola, and Russo were interviewed by Caledon Citizen.

Di Cosola, Russo, and Saini replied to a survey from Caledon Enterprise, while Caputo did not. Caputo, Di Cosola, and Russo attended a debate held by the Caledon Chamber of Commerce. Di Cosola was the only candidate to appear on a Rogers tv candidate message program.

Area Councillors

Ward 1

Both candidates replied to a survey from newspaper Caledon Enterprise. Kate Hepworth and Lynn Kiernan were interviewed by Caledon Citizen. Hepworth was the only candidate to appear in a Rogers tv candidate message program.

Registered candidates
 Lynn Kiernan (incumbent), retired from investment banking
 Kate Hepworth, president, Caledon Village Association

Ward 2 

Incumbent area councillor Christina Early is running for Regional councillor Wards 1, 2, 3, creating an open race in Ward 2.

Hunar Kahlon and Dave Sheen were interviewed by the newspaper Caledon Citizen.

Candidates in the ward received a survey from Caledon Enterprise. Hunar Kahlon, Dave Sheen, and Jagraj Sekhon replied. Kahlon was the only candidate to appear on a Rogers tv candidate message program.

Registered candidates
 Ramat Gill
 Hunar Kahlon, runs an aggregate trucking company
 John Ruscetta
 Dave Sheen
 Jagraj Sekhon

Ward 3 

This ward was previously combined with ward 4. Newly split, there is no incumbent in this ward.

Caledon Citizen has interviewed Derek Clark, Doug Maskell, and Anna Murray.

Caledon Enterprise sent a survey to all candidates in the ward. All replied. Maskell was the only candidate to appear on a Rogers tv candidate message program.

Registered candidates
 Derek Clark
 Arjun McNeill
 Doug Maskell
 Anna Murray, fundraising coordinator

Ward 4 

The incumbent candidate in this ward is Nick deBoer.

Both candidates replied to a survey issued by Caledon Enterprise. Cheryl Connors was interviewed by Caledon Citizen. Connors participated in a podcast discussion with The Pointer. Both Connors and deBoer attended a debate held by the Caledon Chamber of Commerce. Connors was the only candidate to appear on a Rogers tv candidate message program.

Registered candidates
 Nick deBoer (incumbent)
 Cheryl Connors, executive director of the Canadian Network for Respiratory Care, founder Palgrave Residents Association, 2018 candidate for Caledon Ward 3 & 4

Ward 5 

The incumbent candidate in this ward is Tony Rosa.

All candidates in the ward replied to a survey by Caledon Enterprise. Rob Ricciardi, Stacie Roberts, and Tony Rosa were interviewed by Caledon Citizen. Ricciardi, Roberts, Rosa attended a debate held by the Caledon Chamber of Commerce. Roberts and Rosa both appeared on a Rogers tv candidate message program.

Registered candidates
 Roberto Ricciardi, Bolton Village Residents Association
 Tony Rosa (incumbent)
 Stacie Roberts

Ward 6 

Ward 6 is newly created in the wake of ward boundary changes. There is no incumbent.

Mary Balinov, Lucrezia Chiappetta, and Cosimo Napoli replied to questions from Caledon Enterprise, while Angela Panacci did not. Mary Balinov, Lucrezia Chiappetta, Cosimo Napoli, and Angela Panacci were interviewed by Caledon Citizen. Chiappetta and Panacci attended a debate held by the Caledon Chamber of Commerce. Chiappetta was the only candidate to appear on a Rogers tv candidate message program.

Registered candidates
 Mary Balinov, Bolton Village Residents Association
 Lucrezia Chiappetta
 Cosimo Napoli
 Angela Panacci

Mississauga 

The election is guaranteed to see one of the highest turnovers in history, with the retirements of Pat Saito and George Carlson, and the resignation of Karen Ras; her appointed replacement, Patricia Mullin, also is not running. Accusations against incumbent Ron Starr have led the media to suggest his position is vulnerable.

Voter turnout for the 2018 election was 27%.

Mayor 

Bonnie Crombie is the incumbent, and won re-election. She won the 2018 election with 76.68% of the vote.

In an opinion piece for Mississauga News, retired editor John Stewart suggests that she faces "no significant opposition," and is likely to receive a third term.

Crombie's role in the alleged harassment of Karen Ras, leading to her resignation, has been criticized in the media. The Toronto Star published an opinion piece noting that she and city officials must be "held accountable for failing to support Karen Ras. Crombie, who never shies from journalists, TV cameras or scrums, is suddenly unavailable for media interviews. She seems to be taking a page from Premier Doug Ford’s playbook... This fiasco could signal the end of Crombie’s mayoral reign. Crombie cruised to victory in 2014 after being endorsed by former mayor Hazel McCallion, and has had an easy run — until now."

The only other competitor to place in the double digits was Kevin J. Johnston, who in the months prior to his candidacy been charged by Peel Regional Police for "willfully promoting hatred." (Johnston has since been sentenced to jail in two provinces, and ran for Mayor of Calgary in 2021.) 

Crombie launched her campaign on September 7. In 2014, Trivedi was candidate for Mississauga City Council Ward 5.

Bonnie Crombie, Derek Ramkissoon, David Shaw, and George Manuel Tavares replied to a survey from Mississauga News. Mohsin Khan, Melodie J. Petty, Bobetha Taffe, and Jayesh Trivedi did not reply.

Council

Ward 1 

Mississauga News columnist John Stewart suggests that Stephen Dasko "faces the toughest challenge... of the non-Starr incumbents." He will face Lakeview Ratepayers Association president Deborah Goss, a position held by Dasko's predecessor, Jim Tovey.

An all-candidate debate was held by Town of Port Credit Residents Association on October 20. Additional events are to be held October 17 and 20. All three candidates replied to a survey from Mississauga News.

Ward 2 

Former Ward 2 councillor Patricia Mullin (1985-2014) was appointed as Ward 2 councillor, February 2. Mullin's appointment was supported by nine of eleven councillors, with Mayor Crombie among those contesting the process of selection.

Mullin's appointment was made after the resignation of Karen Ras in January 2022. Ras revealed in February that the move was following a three-year period of her car being keyed, allegedly by fellow councillor Ron Starr. Police did not lay charges, and the city's integrity commissioner refused to investigate.

Ras had won the 2018 election with 92.77% of the vote.

All candidates received a survey from Mississauga News. Of them, Gulraiz Bajwa, Chris Cunningham, Silvia Gualtieri, Reead Rahamut, Sue Shanly, Ayushe Sharman, and Alvin Tedjo. Syed Jaffery did not reply. An all-candidate meeting was held October 5 by the Sheridan Homelands Ratepayers’ Association; Cunningham, Gualtieri, Shanly, Sharman, and Tedjo attended. Park Royal Community Association will host a virtual debate on October 18, with seven of the eight candidates scheduled to participate.

Registered candidates
 Gulraiz Bajwa
 Chris Cunningham
 Silvia Gualtieri
 Syed Jaffery
 Reead Rahamut, Green Party of Ontario candidate in the 2022 provincial election
 Sue Shanly
 Ayushe Sharman
 Alvin Tedjo, former Ontario Liberal Party leadership candidate, former MPP candidate

Ward 3 

Mississauga News sent a survey to all candidates in the ward. Chris Fonseca, Sarah Szymanski, and Athina Tagidou replied, while Winston Harding, Robert Kielek, and Robina Yasmeen did not.

A council and trustee candidate meet-and-greet was held on October 5; only Fonseca, Harding, and Tagidou attended.

Registered candidates
 Chris Fonseca (incumbent)
 Winston Harding, 2014 councillor candidate for Mississauga Ward 1, 2018 councillor candidate for Mississauga Ward 7
 Robert Kielek
 Sarah Szymanski, part-time autoworker and teacher's assistant, running as a candidate for the Municipal Socialist Alliance
 Athina Tagidou
 Robina Yasmeen

Ward 4 

All candidates in this ward replied to a questionnaire from Mississauga News.

Registered candidates
 Michelle Bilek
 John Kovac (incumbent)
 Joan Pace Jakobsen, project manager

Ward 5 

Of the candidates, Hamid Akbar, Carolyn Parrish, and Domenica Laura Simone all replied to a questionnaire from Mississauga News. Bradley Macdonald is not.

Bob Singh previously appeared on the list of registered candidates; it is presumed that he has withdrawn. Ahmad Khan withdrew to run for Ward 5 Peel District School Board trustee.

Ward 6 

The first registered candidate was Joe Horneck. Incumbent Ron Starr is seeking re-election to a fifth term, amid an unsettled investigation.

Incumbent Ron Starr is in his fourth term on Mississauga council. During the 2018 election, Starr registered to run for Region of Peel Chair — at that point intended to be a directly elected position — leaving his original ward vacant. Faced with a crowded slate of nominees, Starr withdrew that nomination and returned to his original ward. He won by the slimmest margin in the election, with a Mississauga News columnist noting Joe Horneck's loss "more politically impressive" than some of the wins, having "almost unseated an entrenched council vet in a stable ward." Starr had suggested that the 2018–2022 term might be his last. Starr filed for re-election on June 27.

Between 2019 and 2021, incumbent councillor Ron Starr is alleged to have keyed the car of councillor Karen Ras eight times. Starr has denied that he is the person pictured in the footage. Ras filed a complaint into the matter, but police did not lay charges, "in consultation with the complainant and the Crown's office." Ras asked the City integrity commissioner Robert Swayze to investigate it as a violation of the council's code of conduct, however the code prevents investigation of possibly criminal acts. According to Ras, Mayor Crombie declined to address the issue. As a result, Ras resigned in January 2022, taking a job elsewhere. After Ras later revealed details of the issue to the media, Mississauga City Council held an "hour-long" closed meeting, resulting in a motion to ask the integrity commissioner to investigate, and asking Starr to take a leave of absence.

Of the candidates, Joe Horneck and Ron Starr replied to a survey from Mississauga News. Both Horneck and Starr appeared on a podcast from The Pointer.

Sachin Ryan Kharbanda previously appeared on the list of candidates; Kharbanda has withdrawn.

Ward 7 

Incumbent Dipika Damerla ran unsuccessfully for provincial office, during the previous term, receiving criticism for taking a leave of absence.

Additional candidates include Leslie Zurek-Silvestri, former Art Gallery of Mississauga president. An unreleased third-party investigation found her involved in "psychological harassment of others" and "workplace violence," which led to a series of events culminating in her being banned from Mississauga City Hall.

Of the candidates, Amir Ali, Dipika Damerla, Mark Freeland, Iain McCallum, Maisa Salhia, and Leslie Zurek-Silvestri all replied to a questionnaire from Mississauga News. Ranjit Chahal did not reply.

Registered candidates
 Amir Ali
 Ranjit Chahal, 2000 Mississauga Ward 5 council candidate, 2010 Mississauga mayoral candidate
 Dipika Damerla (incumbent)
 Mark Freeland, construction worker and unionist, candidate from the Municipal Socialist Alliance
 Iain McCallum
 Maisa Salhia, freelance marketing consultant
 Leslie Zurek-Silvestri

Ward 8 

Councillor Matt Mahoney is the incumbent.

In 2018, Mahoney was unopposed until the final week of the nomination period.

All candidates replied to a survey from Mississauga News.

Registered candidates
 Irfan Farooq
 Matt Mahoney (incumbent)
 Rahul Mehta

Ward 9 

Incumbent Pat Saito announced plans to retire by at least January 2019, offering to mentor those interested in becoming a candidate. In 2018, Saito was unopposed until the final week of the nomination period.

Martin Reid has received the endorsement of Saito.

Isaiah Bryant and Bob Delaney participated in a podcast discussion with The Pointer. Bryant, Nokha Dakroub, Delaney, Len Little, Nicholas Rabba, and Martin Reid replied to a survey from Mississauga News. Chacko Athanasius, Scott E.W. Chapman, Frank Fang, Peter McCallion, and Mohammad Shabbeer did not reply to the outlet.

Syed Jaffery was previously registered, but withdrew.

Registered candidates
 Chacko Athanasius
 Isaiah Bryant
 Scott E. W. Chapman, 2014 and 2018 candidate for Mayor of Mississauga
 Nokha Dakroub, Peel District School Board trustee
 Bob Delaney, Member of Provincial Parliament from 2003 to 2018
 Frank Fang
 Len Little, restaurant owner, 2014 candidate for city councillor Ward 9, 2022 MPP candidate for Mississauga-Streetsville (None of the Above Party)
 Peter McCallion
 Nicholas Rabba, 2022 MPP candidate for Mississauga-Streetsville (Ontario NDP)
 Martin Reid
 Mohammad Shabbeer

Charbel Bassil was a candidate, but withdrew to run for French separate school trustee. Jacob Chacko was previously on the list.

Ward 10 

Mississauga News columnist John Stewart has note Brennan Bempong's "disarming and charming extrovert whose naivety about the political world is part of his attraction."

Mississauga News sent a survey to all candidates, and all replied.

Registered candidates
 Hamza Bajwa
 Brennan Bempong, former orthopedic technician
 Khalid Mahmood, realtor
 Sue McFadden (incumbent)

Ward 11 

Incumbent councillor George Carlson has retired from the ward. He is endorsing Brad Butt.

Of the candidates, Imran Hasan twice ran to unseat George Carlson. In 2014, he came second with 17.2% to Carlson's 68.2%, and second in 2018 with 22.1% to Carlson's 69.0%. Butt, Chawla, and Hasan participated in a podcast conversation with The Pointer. Butt, Chawla, Hasan, and Kushagr Sharma replied to a survey from Mississauga News. Kulbir Gill and Brian Rylance did not reply.

Registered candidates
 Brad Butt, former Conservative MP for Mississauga—Streetsville
 Annurag Chawla, real estate broker
 Kulbir Gill, transit operations supervisor
 Imran Hasan, 2014 and 2018 city council candidate for Ward 11, non-profit volunteer
 Brian Rylance
 Kushagr Dutt Sharma

Peel District School Board

Retired college educator Stan Cameron was acclaimed to his position as Caledon school trustee, having faced no competition for the position.

 Brampton Wards 1, 5: Harparminderjit Singh Gadri, David Green (incumbent), Sophia Jackson, Shajinder Padda, Ali Qamar, Vipul Shah
 Brampton Wards 2, 6: Arun Alex, Yvonne Azaglo, Daniella Balasal, David W. Bosveld, Will Davies (incumbent), Mansoor Mirza, Nicardo Francis, Blair Nitchke, Abdul Raheem, Paula Schulzke, Nirpal Sekhon
 Brampton Wards 3, 4: Guillermo Dacosta Ferrer, Ranjit S. Dhaliwal, Claudio Calvin Lewis, Kathy McDonald (incumbent)
 Brampton Wards 7, 8: Karla Bailey, Pushproop Brar, Michael J. Gyovai, Jamie Peddle, Pardeep Kaur Sanghera, Enver Singh Sumbal, Raheel Yousaf
 Brampton Wards 9, 10: Ravdeep Bassi, Taranvir Dhaliwal, Atif Ejaz, Yadwinder Gossal, Therese Guidolin, Satpaul Singh Johal, Muhammad Idrees Khan, André S. Levy
 Caledon: Stan Cameron (incumbent, acclaimed)
 Mississauga Ward 1, 7: Alexa Barkley, Vijay Bhosekar, LeeAnn Cole, Mohit Hardikar, Areeb Jasper Kohkhar, Lina Pavlovic, Robert Pollard, Shivakumar Sethumadhavan, Paul Skippen, Scott Walker, Melanie Wilson-Nikolov
 Mississauga Ward 2, 8: Shawn Abrahim, Brad Hutchinson, Natalie Kwan, Brad MacDonald (incumbent), Adam Parmentier, Nicole Sutton
 Mississauga Ward 3, 4: Mahmoud Ahmed, Lucas Alves, Jad Ghali, Hameez Iqbal, Bojan Mitrovic, Matt Riggs, Mashkoor Sherwani
 Mississauga Ward 5: Susan Benjamin (incumbent), Avtar Ghotra, Ryan Gurcharn, Ahmad Khan, Van Nguyen, Romana Siddiqui
 Mississauga Ward 6, 11: Glynis D'Souza, Bill McBain, Bijay Paudel, Jill Promoli, Audrey Simpson, Sharon Siriboe
 Mississauga Ward 9, 10: Sabina Alam, Nuhad Ayad, Jeff Clark, Javed Faruqui, Kiran Sawhney

After the election, Mississauga News columnist John Stewart extensively profiled newly elected trustee Jeff Clark.

Alexa Barkley originally registered for trustee Mississauga Ward 2 & 8. Bojan Mitrovic originally registered for Mississauga Ward 6 & 11. Ahmad Khan was originally registered as a city council candidate for Mississauga Ward 5. Erica Allen was registered as candidate for trustee, Brampton Wards 9 & 10. Kelly Ralston was running for Ward 1, 7, but withdrew.

Dufferin-Peel Catholic District School Board

Thomas Thomas was acclaimed to the position, having run unopposed.

 Brampton Wards 1, 3, 4: Dominique Darmanin-Sturgeon, Theresa Laverty, Anisha Thomas
 Brampton Wards 2, 5, 6: Nelson Carepa, Darryl Brian D'Souza (incumbent), Damien Joseph, Ana Solis Alfano
 Brampton Wards 7, 8, 9, 10: Christine Allen, Kathyann Bruney, Roxanne Smith, Marichelle Wilkinson Carle, Shawn Xaviour (incumbent)
 Caledon: Paula Dametto-Giovannozzi, Domenic Maggi, Vince Manzella, Sheralyn Roman
 Mississauga Wards 1, 3: Mary Jo Ferriera, Lorenzo Palermo, Mario Pascucci (incumbent)
 Mississauga Wards 2, 8: Romano Bergic, Ivana Genua, Joanna Maj, Sergio Raez Villanueva, Arnold Rego, Oksana Stech, Magdalena Strecker, Herman Viloria
 Mississauga Wards 4: Stefano Pascucci (incumbent), Mathew Thomas
 Mississauga Wards 5: Thomas Thomas (incumbent)
 Mississauga Wards 6, 11: Luz Del Rosario (incumbent), Tomy Kokkat
 Mississauga Wards 7: Bruno Iannicca (incumbent), Jennifer Mitchell
 Mississauga Wards 9, 10: Charbel Bassil, Brea Corbet (incumbent), Jacob Mathew, Allwyn Sequeira

Dominique Darmanin-Sturgeon registered as a candidate for Brampton Wards 2, 5, 6, before withdrawing and registering for 1, 3, 4.

Conseil scolaire Viamonde

Yvon Rochefort was elected by acclamation, as no one ran against him.

 Peel: Yvon Rochefort

Conseil scolaire catholique MonAvenir

Estelle Ah-Kiow was acclaimed to the position, having run unopposed.

 Brampton and Caledon: Genevieve Grenier, Patrick O'Neil
 Mississauga: Estelle Ah-Kiow

References

External links
 City of Brampton: General information, Registered candidates
 City of Mississauga: General information, Registered candidates
 Town of Caledon: General information, Registered candidates

Peel
Regional Municipality of Peel